Pujiang may refer to the following in China:

Pujiang County, Sichuan (蒲江县), county of Chengdu
Pujiang County, Zhejiang (浦江县), county of Jinhua
Huangpu River, also called Pujiang, the main river of Shanghai
Pujiang, Shanghai (浦江镇), a town in Minhang District
Pujiang Town station (浦江镇站), station on Shanghai Metro Line 8
Pujiang line (浦江线), a Shanghai Metro line in Pujiang town